Admiralty House may refer to:

 Admiralty House, Sydney, Australia
 Admiralty House, Bermuda, including the four locations that served this function:
 Rose Hill, Bermuda, St. George's
 St. John's Hill (later Clarence Hill), a property at Spanish Point, Bermuda
 Mount Wyndham, Bermuda, above Bailey's Bay
 Admiralty House, in Halifax, Nova Scotia, Canada, now the Naval Museum of Halifax
 Admiralty House, Mount Pearl, Canada, also known as Admiralty House Museum & Archives
 Admiralty House, at Sheerness Dockyard, Kent, England
 Admiralty House, London, England, the residence of the First Lord of the Admiralty, 1788-1964
 Admiralty House, Mount Wise, England (formerly Government House)
 Hamoaze House (Admiralty House from 1809 to 1934), Mount Wise, Plymouth, England
 Het Admiraliteitshuis (The Admiralty House), Dokkum, Finland; see Admiralty of Friesland
 Marble Hall (Hong Kong), from c. 1935–1946
 Great Western Building (Admiralty House from 1770 to 1795), Mumbai, India
 Benedictine Convent (Cobh) (formerly Admiralty House), County Cork, Ireland
 Admiralty House (Valletta), Malta
 Admiralty House, Simon's Town, Cape Town, South Africa
 Admiralty House (Stockholm), Sweden

See also
 Former Admiralty House, Singapore
 Navy House, Trincomalee, Sri Lanka
 Admiralty House Act, a statute of New Zealand